The following were mistresses of Swedish royal family members.

House of Bonde
 1464-1470: Kristina Abrahamsdotter, mistress of Charles VIII of Sweden before their marriage in 1470

House of Vasa
 1558-1561: Agda Persdotter, mistress of Eric XIV of Sweden
 1561-1565: Karin Jacobsdotter, mistress of Eric XIV of Sweden
 1565-1568: Karin Månsdotter, mistress of Eric XIV before their marriage in 1568
 1568-1573: Karin Hansdotter, mistress of John III of Sweden
 1568-1578: Karin Nilsdotter, mistress of Charles IX of Sweden
 1615-1616: Margareta Slots, mistress of Gustavus Adolphus of Sweden

House of Palatinate-Zweibrücken
 1646-1647: Märta Allerts, mistress of Charles X Gustav of Sweden

House of Hesse
 1730-1743: Hedvig Taube, mistress of Frederick I of Sweden
 1745-1748: Catharina Ebba Horn, mistress of Frederick I of Sweden

House of Holstein-Gottorp

 1778-1793 : Sophie Hagman, mistress of Prince Frederick Adolf of Sweden
 1760-1765 : Marie Marguerite Morel, mistress of Adolf Frederick of Sweden. 
 1771-1778 : Augusta Fersen, mistress of Charles XIII of Sweden
 1779-1781 : Charlotte Eckerman, mistress of Charles XIII of Sweden. 
 1781-1783 : Françoise-Éléonore Villain, mistress of Charles XIII of Sweden. 
 1777-1797 : Charlotte Slottsberg, mistress of Charles XIII of Sweden.
 1810-1818: Mariana Koskull, mistress of Charles XIII of Sweden.

House of Bernadotte
 1811-1823: Mariana Koskull, mistress of Charles XIV John of Sweden, former mistress of Charles XIII of Sweden
 1834-1840: Emilie Högquist, mistress of Oscar I of Sweden
 1819-1827: Jaquette Löwenhielm, mistress of Oscar I of Sweden
 c. 1850: Laura Bergnéhr, mistress of Charles XV of Sweden
 1852-1860: Josephine Sparre, mistress of Charles XV of Sweden
 1860-1869: Johanna Styrell, mistress of Charles XV of Sweden
 1869-1872: Wilhelmine Schröder, mistress of Charles XV of Sweden
 1858-1858: Elise Hwasser, mistress of Charles XV of Sweden
 1880s: Marie Friberg, mistress of Oscar II of Sweden
 Emma Elisabeth Hammarström, mistress of Oscar II of Sweden
 Camilla Henemark, mistress of Carl XVI Gustaf of Sweden

See also
List of English royal mistresses
List of Scottish royal mistresses

References

 
Royal mistress
Lists of Swedish people by occupation
Swedish